The 2012 San Marino CEPU Open was a professional tennis tournament plays on clay courts. It was the 25th edition of the tournament which is part of the Tretorn SERIE+ of the 2012 ATP Challenger Tour. It takes place in City of San Marino, San Marino between 6 and 12 August 2012.

Singles main draw entrants

Seeds

 1 Rankings are as of August 1, 2012.

Other entrants
The following players received wildcards into the singles main draw:
  Alessio di Mauro
  Stefano Galvani
  Nicolás Massú
  Walter Trusendi

The following players received entry from the qualifying draw:
  Claudio Grassi
  Guillermo Hormazábal
  Miliaan Niesten
  Stéphane Robert

Champions

Singles

  Martin Kližan def.  Simone Bolelli, 6–3, 6–1

Doubles

  Lukáš Dlouhý /  Michal Mertiňák def.  Stefano Ianni /  Matteo Viola, 2–6, 7–6(7–3), [11–9]

External links
Official Website
ITF Search
ATP official site

San Marino CEPU Open
San Marino CEPU Open